Amerika Pradhan is an Indian politician who served as a member of the Uttar Pradesh 15th Legislative Assembly from Sadat, Ghazipur constituency between 2007 and 2012.

References

External links
 http://eci.nic.in/archive/May2007/pollupd/ac/states/S24/Aconst219.htm
 http://uplegisassembly.gov.in/ENGLISH/Assemblywise_members.aspx?AssNo=15

Date of birth missing (living people)
Living people
Uttar Pradesh MLAs 2007–2012
Politicians from Ghazipur
Year of birth missing (living people)